Darwin L. Booher (born September 19, 1942) is a former Republican member of the Michigan Senate, representing the 35th district from 2010 until 2018. He previously served three terms in the House of Representatives.

References

Republican Party members of the Michigan House of Representatives
Republican Party Michigan state senators
People from Evart, Michigan
University of Wisconsin–Madison alumni
1942 births
Living people
21st-century American politicians